Vatanen is a Finnish surname. Notable people with the surname include:

Ari Vatanen (born 1952), Finnish rally driver and politician
Jussi Vatanen (1875–1936), Finnish politician
Sami Vatanen (born 1991), Finnish ice hockey player

Finnish-language surnames